István Sándor (born 4 January 1986) is a Hungarian football player who plays for Tarpa SC.

References
Player profile at HLSZ

External links

1986 births
Living people
Sportspeople from Uzhhorod
Hungarian footballers
Association football midfielders
Nemzeti Bajnokság I players
Hungarian expatriate footballers
Expatriate footballers in Belarus
Hungarian expatriate sportspeople in Belarus
Újpest FC players
Vác FC players
Győri ETO FC players
BKV Előre SC footballers
Budapest Honvéd FC players
FC Tatabánya players
Fehérvár FC players
FC Felcsút players
Budaörsi SC footballers
FC Naftan Novopolotsk players
Ceglédi VSE footballers
Balmazújvárosi FC players
Nyíregyháza Spartacus FC players
Soroksári TE footballers
FC Ajka players
Ukrainian people of Hungarian descent
Jászberényi SE footballers
Komáromi FC footballers